Malcolm James "Mal" Kutner (March 27, 1921 – February 4, 2005) was an American football end in the National Football League (NFL), and was selected as the NFL Most Valuable Player in 1948 while playing with the Chicago Cardinals.

He played college football at the University of Texas where he was an AP All-American in 1941.

He was an All-Pro End and, in 1947, he was selected as the NFL's Player of the Year.  He was inducted into the National Football Foundation's College Hall of Fame in 1974 and into the Texas Sports Hall of Fame in 1990.

Malcolm Kutner graduated from Wilson High School in 1938 and, in 1990, was inducted into Wilson's Hall of Fame.

References

External links

 
 

1921 births
2005 deaths
American football ends
Chicago Cardinals players
Bunker Hill Naval Air Station Blockbusters football players
Iowa Pre-Flight Seahawks football players
Texas Longhorns football players
College Football Hall of Fame inductees
Players of American football from Dallas